Haresfield is a village near Gloucester, Gloucestershire, England around one mile from Junction 12 of the M5 motorway and between the villages of Brookthorpe, Harescombe and Hardwicke. The population of the village taken at the 2011 census was 378.

Haresfield today is a largely residential village with a pub, The Beacon Inn. The church, which is dedicated to St Peter, is apart from the village itself and accessed by a public right of way on a private drive. The village was formerly served on the Bristol and Gloucester Railway by Haresfield railway station.

References 

Villages in Gloucestershire
Stroud District